The HVDC Thailand–Malaysia is a 110 kilometer long HVDC powerline between Khlong Ngae in Thailand at  and Gurun in Malaysia. The HVDC connection Thailand–Malaysia is a monopolar 300 kV overhead line with a maximum transmission rate of 300 megawatts. The inverter hall is designed as Chinese style building.

External links 

 https://web.archive.org/web/20050404050500/http://www.egat.co.th/hvdc/INTRODUCTION.HTML 
 https://web.archive.org/web/20051102091726/http://www.siemens.com/Daten/siecom/HQ/PTD/Internet/PTD_Unitwide/WORKAREA/ptd_h_ce/templatedata/Deutsch/file/binary/Interconnection_268319.pdf

HVDC transmission lines
Electric power infrastructure in Malaysia
Electric power infrastructure in Thailand
Malaysia–Thailand relations
Energy infrastructure completed in 2002
2002 establishments in Malaysia
2002 establishments in Thailand